Francesco Foscari (19 June 1373 – 1 November 1457) was the 65th Doge of the Republic of Venice from 1423 to 1457. His reign, the longest of all Doges in Venetian history, lasted 34 years, 6 months and 8 days, and coincided with the inception of the Italian Renaissance.

Biography

Francesco Foscari was born in 1373, as the oldest son of Nicolò Foscari and his wife Cateruzia Michiel. The Foscari family had been of only moderate importance, but had managed to become one of the few noble families that secured a hereditary place in the Great Council of Venice after the so-called Serrata ("Closing") of the Great Council, and had begun to rise in prominence throughout the 14th century. Francesco's ancestors began holding high public office, and his father Nicolò even became a member of the powerful Council of Ten.

Francesco served the Republic of Venice in numerous official capacities—as ambassador, president of the Council of Forty, member of the Council of Ten, inquisitor, Procurator of St Mark's, avogador de comùn— before he was elected in 1423 defeating the other candidate, Pietro Loredan. His task as doge was to lead Venice in a long and protracted series of wars against Milan, governed by the Visconti, who were attempting to dominate all of northern Italy. Despite the justification of Venetian embroilment in the terraferma that was offered in Foscari's funeral oration, delivered by the humanist senator and historian Bernardo Giustiniani, and some victories, the war was extremely costly to Venice, whose real source of wealth and power was at sea.  Venice, which during Foscari's leadership abandoned her ally Florence, was eventually overcome by the forces of Milan under the leadership of Francesco Sforza. Sforza soon made peace with Florence, however, leaving Venice alone.

Foscari was married twice: first to Maria Priuli, and then in 1415 to Marina Nani. In 1445, his only surviving son, Jacopo, was tried by the Council of Ten on charges of bribery and corruption and exiled from the city. Two further trials, in 1450 and 1456 – during the latter he confessed, without even the need of torture, to having pleaded for help from the Ottoman Sultan Mehmed II and the aforementioned Duke of Milan, both Venice's enemies – led to Jacopo's imprisonment on Crete and his eventual death there soon after.

News of Jacopo's death caused Foscari to withdraw from his government duties, and in October 1457 the Council of Ten forced him to abdicate. However, his death a week later provoked such public outcry that he was given a state funeral.

Beside his profile portrait by Lazzaro Bastiani, Foscari commissioned a bas-relief bronze plaquette from Donatello, which survives in several examples. His figure kneeling in prayer to St Mark figured over the portal to the Doge's Palace until it was dismantled by order of the revolutionary government, 1797; the head was preserved and is conserved in the Museo dell'Opera di Palazzo Ducale. His monument by the sculptor Antonio Bregno in collaboration with his architect brother Paolo was erected in the church of Santa Maria dei Frari in Venice.

In literature and opera
Foscari's life was the subject of a play The Two Foscari by Lord Byron (1821) and an episode in Samuel Rogers' long poem Italy. The Byron play served as the basis for the libretto written by Francesco Maria Piave for Giuseppe Verdi's opera I due Foscari, which premiered on 3 November 1844 in Rome. Mary Mitford, author of the popular literary sketches of the English countryside entitled Our Village, also wrote a successful play concerned with events in Foscari's life. Mitford's play Foscari debuted at Covent Garden in 1826 with famed actor Charles Kemble in the lead.

See also
Ca' Foscari, built by Francesco Foscari on the Grand Canal.

Notes

Sources

External links

1373 births
1457 deaths
14th-century Venetian people
15th-century Doges of Venice
Ambassadors of the Republic of Venice
Medieval Italian diplomats
Francesco
15th-century diplomats
Procurators of Saint Mark
Burials at Santa Maria Gloriosa dei Frari